Mexico Public Schools #59 is a public school system serving Mexico, Missouri, United States.  Students in the district are eligible to attend the Davis H. Hart Career Center.

Schools

Secondary schools
 Mexico Senior High School
 Mexico Middle School

Elementary schools
 Eugene Field Elementary School
 Hawthorne Elementary School

Early childhood schools
 McMillan Early Learning Center

Alternative school
 Mexico Education Center

References

External links

 

School districts in Missouri
Education in Audrain County, Missouri